Pearly Gates is a 2015 American drama film directed by Scott Ehrlich and starring Scott Grimes, Uzo Aduba (her film debut) and Lainie Kazan.

Cast
Scott Grimes as Richard Whiner
Bonnie Somerville as Sharon
Illeana Douglas as Karen
Uzo Aduba as Corrie
Hill Harper as Dave
Lainie Kazan as Millie
Sam McMurray as Sol
Jack Noseworthy as Dan
Peter Bogdanovich as Marty
Larry Miller as Rabbi
Vincent Spano as Mayor / Satan
Jason Gray-Stanford as The Assistant

References

External links
 

American drama films
2015 drama films
2015 films
2010s English-language films
2010s American films